This is a list of electoral divisions and wards in the ceremonial county of Greater Manchester in North West England. All changes since the re-organisation of local government following the passing of the Local Government Act 1972 are shown. The number of councillors elected for each electoral division or ward is shown in brackets.

District councils

Bolton
Wards from 1 April 1974 (first election 10 May 1973) to 1 May 1980:

Wards from 1 May 1980 to 10 June 2004:

Wards from 10 June 2004 to present:

Bury
Wards from 1 April 1974 (first election 10 May 1973) to 3 May 1979:

Wards from 3 May 1979 to 10 June 2004:

Wards from 10 June 2004 to 5 May 2022:

Wards from 5 May 2022:

Manchester
Wards from 1 April 1974 (first election 10 May 1973) to 6 May 1982:

Wards from 6 May 1982 to 10 June 2004:

Wards from 10 June 2004 to 2 May 2018:

Wards from 3 May 2018 onwards:

Oldham
Wards from 1 April 1974 (first election 10 May 1973) to 3 May 1979:

Wards from 3 May 1979 to 10 June 2004:

Wards from 10 June 2004 to present:

Rochdale
Wards from 1 April 1974 (first election 10 May 1973) to 1 May 1980:

Wards from 1 May 1980 to 10 June 2004:

Wards from 10 June 2004 to 5 May 2022:

Wards from 5 May 2022:

Salford
Wards from 1 April 1974 (first election 10 May 1973) to 6 May 1982:

Wards from 6 May 1982 to 10 June 2004:

Wards from 10 June 2004 to 6 May 2021:

Wards from 6 May 2021 to present:

Stockport
Wards from 1 April 1974 (first election 10 May 1973) to 1 May 1980:

Wards from 1 May 1980 to 10 June 2004:

Wards from 10 June 2004 to present:

Tameside
Wards from 1 April 1974 (first election 10 May 1973) to 1 May 1980:

Wards from 1 May 1980 to 10 June 2004:

Wards from 10 June 2004 to present:

Trafford
Wards from 1 April 1974 (first election 10 May 1973) to 1 May 1980:

Wards from 1 May 1980 to 10 June 2004:

Wards from 10 June 2004 to present:

Wigan
Wards from 1 April 1974 (first election 10 May 1973) to 1 May 1980:

Wards from 1 May 1980 to 10 June 2004:

Wards from 10 June 2004 to present:

Former county council

Greater Manchester
Electoral Divisions from 1 April 1974 (first election 12 April 1973) to 1 April 1986 (county council abolished):

Electoral Divisions due from 2 May 1985 (order revoked by the Local Government Act 1985):

Electoral wards by constituency

Altrincham and Sale West
Altrincham, Ashton upon Mersey, Bowdon, Broadheath, Hale Barns, Hale Central, St Mary's, Timperley, Village.

Ashton-under-Lyne
Ashton Hurst, Ashton St. Michael's, Ashton Waterloo, Droylsden East, Droylsden West, Failsworth East, Failsworth West, St. Peters.

Blackley and Broughton
Broughton, Charlestown, Cheetham, Crumpsall, Harpurhey, Higher Blackley, Kersal.

Bolton North East
Astley Bridge, Bradshaw, Breightmet, Bromley Cross, Crompton, Halliwell, Tonge with the Haulgh.

Bolton South East
Farnworth, Great Lever, Harper Green, Hulton, Kearsley, Little Lever and Darcy Lever, Rumworth.

Bolton West
Atherton, Heaton and Lostock, Horwich and Blackrod, Horwich North East, Smithills, Westhoughton North and Chew Moor, Westhoughton South.

Bury North
Church, East, Elton, Moorside, North Manor, Ramsbottom, Redvales, Tottington.

Bury South
Besses, Holyrood, Pilkington Park, Radcliffe East, Radcliffe North, Radcliffe West, St Mary's, Sedgley, Unsworth.

Cheadle
Bramhall North, Bramhall South, Cheadle and Gatley, Cheadle Hulme North, Cheadle Hulme South, Heald Green, Stepping Hill.

Denton and Reddish
Audenshaw, Denton North East, Denton South, Denton West, Dukinfield, Reddish North, Reddish South.

Hazel Grove
Bredbury and Woodley, Bredbury Green and Romiley, Hazel Grove, Marple North, Marple South, Offerton.

Heywood and Middleton
Bamford, Castleton, East Middleton, Hopwood Hall, Norden, North Heywood, North Middleton, South Middleton,
West Heywood, West Middleton.

Leigh
Astley Mosley Common, Atherleigh, Golborne and Lowton West, Leigh East, Leigh South, Leigh West, Lowton East, Tyldesley.

Makerfield
Abram, Ashton, Bryn, Hindley, Hindley Green, Orrell, Winstanley, Worsley Mesnes.

Manchester Central
Ancoats and Beswick, Ardwick, Clayton and Openshaw, Deansgate, Hulme, Miles Platting and Newton Heath, Moss Side, Moston, Piccadilly.

Manchester, Gorton
Gorton and Abbey Hey, Fallowfield, Levenshulme, Longsight, Rusholme, Whalley Range.

Manchester, Withington
Burnage, Chorlton, Chorlton Park, Didsbury East, Didsbury West, Old Moat, Withington.

Oldham East and Saddleworth
Alexandra, Crompton, Saddleworth North, Saddleworth South, Saddleworth West and Lees, St James’, St Mary's, Shaw, Waterhead.

Oldham West and Royton
Chadderton Central, Chadderton North, Chadderton South, Coldhurst, Hollinwood, Medlock Vale, Royton North, Royton South, Werneth.

Rochdale
Balderstone and Kirkholt, Central Rochdale, Healey, Kingsway, Littleborough Lakeside, Milkstone and Deeplish, Milnrow and Newhey, Smallbridge and Firgrove, Spotland and Falinge, Wardle and West Littleborough.

Salford and Eccles
Claremont, Eccles, Irwell Riverside, Langworthy, Ordsall, Pendlebury, Swinton North, Swinton South, Weaste and Seedley.

Stalybridge and Hyde
Dukinfield / Stalybridge, Hyde Godley, Hyde Newton, Hyde Werneth, Longdendale, Mossley, Stalybridge North, Stalybridge South.

Stockport
Brinnington and Central, Davenport and Cale Green, Edgeley and Cheadle Heath, Heatons North, Heatons South, Manor.

Stretford and Urmston
Bucklow-St. Martins, Clifford, Davyhulme East, Davyhulme West, Flixton, Gorse Hill, Longford, Stretford, Urmston.

Wigan
Aspull, New Springs and Whelley, Douglas, Ince, Pemberton, Shevington with Lower Ground, Standish with Langtree, Wigan Central, Wigan West.

Worsley and Eccles South
Barton, Boothstown and Ellenbrook, Cadishead, Irlam, Little Hulton, Walkden North, Walkden South, Winton, Worsley.

Wythenshawe and Sale East
Baguley, Brooklands (Manchester), Brooklands (Trafford), Northenden, Priory, Sale Moor, Sharston, Woodhouse Park.

See also
List of parliamentary constituencies in Greater Manchester

References
http://www.opsi.gov.uk/si/si2007/uksi_20071681_en_1

Greater Manchester